Mantler is a surname. Notable people with the surname include:

Karen Mantler (born 1966), American jazz pianist, singer, and composer
Lisa and Lena Mantler (born 2002), German social media personalities
Michael Mantler (born 1943), Austrian avant-garde jazz trumpeter and composer
Theodor Mantler (1893-1970), Austrian football goalkeeper and referee

See also
Mantle (surname)